The UK Albums Chart is one of many music charts compiled by the Official Charts Company that calculates the best-selling albums of the week in the United Kingdom. Since 2004 the chart has been based on the sales of both physical albums and digital downloads. This list shows albums that peaked in the Top 10 of the UK Albums Chart during 2005, as well as albums which peaked in 2004 and 2006 but were in the top 10 in 2005. The entry date is when the album appeared in the top 10 for the first time (week ending, as published by the Official Charts Company, which is six days after the chart is announced).

One-hundred and twenty-nine albums were in the top ten this year. Nineteen albums from 2004 remained in the top 10 for several weeks at the beginning of the year, while Breakaway by Kelly Clarkson, Employment by Kaiser Chiefs, In Between Dreams by Jack Johnson, PCD by The Pussycat Dolls and Stars of CCTV by Hard-Fi were all released in 2005 but did not reach their peak until 2006. Hot Fuss by The Killers and Love Songs: A Compilation… Old and New by Phil Collins were the albums from 2004 to reach their peak in 2005. Eight artists scored multiple entries in the top 10 in 2005. Akon, James Blunt, Kaiser Chiefs, Kelly Clarkson and The Pussycat Dolls were among the many artists who achieved their first UK charting top 10 album in 2005.

The 2004 Christmas number-one album, Greatest Hits by Robbie Williams, remained at the top spot for the first week of 2005. American Idiot by Green Day returned for a second week as a chart topper after scaling the chart in October 2004, followed by the self titled album by Scissor Sisters which spent its third of four separate weeks as a chart topper. The first new number-one album of the year was Hot Fuss by The Killers. Overall, thirty-three different albums peaked at number-one in 2005, with Robbie Williams (2) having the most albums hit that position.

Background

Multiple entries
One-hundred and twenty-nine albums charted in the top 10 in 2005, with one-hundred and two albums reaching their peak this year (including Greatest Hits (Mariah Carey) and Jeff Wayne's Musical Version of The War of the Worlds, which both charted in previous years but reached a peak on their latest chart run).

Eight artists scored multiple entries in the top 10 in 2005. Eminem, Franz Ferdinand, G4, Green Day, Il Divo, Mariah Carey, Robbie Williams and Westlife were the acts who had two top 10 albums this year. G4's two entries were both released this year, with Greatest Hits by Mariah Carey returning after missing the top 10 when it was first released in 2001.

Chart debuts
Thirty-one artists achieved their first top 10 album in 2005 as a lead artist.

The following table (collapsed on desktop site) does not include acts who had previously charted as part of a group and secured their first top 10 solo album, or featured appearances on compilations or other artists recordings. 
 

Notes
Gwen Stefani kickstarted her solo career in 2005 with her debut album Love. Angel. Music. Baby. reaching number 4. Her previous album chart success was as part of her group No Doubt. Strange Sensation was a group created by former Led Zeppelin frontman Robert Plant after years of success on his own. Their first album Dreamland had missed the top ten in 2002, stalling at number 20.

Lee Ryan had three successive number-one albums in the line-up of Blue, beginning with All Rise in 2001, followed by One Love and Guilty in successive years. His self titled album was his first and only solo entry on the album chart. Babyshambles was a new project for former Libertines singer Pete Doherty, with their debut album Down in Albion reaching number ten.

Best-selling albums
James Blunt had the best-selling album of the year with Back to Bedlam. The album spent 40 weeks in the top 10 (including ten weeks at number one), sold almost 2.368 million copies and was certified 8× platinum by the BPI. X & Y by Coldplay came in second place. Robbie Williams' Intensive Care, Employment from Kaiser Chiefs and Demon Days by Gorillaz made up the top five. Albums by Westlife, KT Tunstall, Kelly Clarkson, Eminem and Faithless were also in the top ten best-selling albums of the year.

Top-ten albums
Key

Entries by artist
The following table shows artists who achieved two or more top 10 entries in 2005, including albums that reached their peak in 2004. The figures only include main artists, with featured artists and appearances on compilation albums not counted individually for each artist. The total number of weeks an artist spent in the top ten in 2005 is also shown.

Notes

 Stars of CCTV reached its peak of number-one on 28 January 2006 (week ending).
 Breakaway reached its peak of number three on 7 January 2006 (week ending).
 Employment reached its peak of number two on 25 February 2006 (week ending).
 In Between Dreams reached its peak of number-one on 4 March 2006 (week ending).
 PCD reached its peak of number seven on 8 July 2006 (week ending).
 Hopes and Fears re-entered the top 10 at number 6 on 15 January 2005 (week ending) for 10 weeks, at number 5 on 16 July 2005 (week ending) and at number 9 on 30 July 2005 (week ending) for 2 weeks.
 Il Divo re-entered the top 10 at number 6 on 5 March 2005 (week ending) for 2 weeks.
 Love Songs: A Compilation… Old and New re-entered the top 10 at number 9 on 19 February 2005 (week ending) and at number 10 on 12 March 2005 (week ending).
 How to Dismantle an Atomic Bomb re-entered the top 10 at number 10 on 22 January 2005 (week ending) and at number 10 on 26 February 2005 (week ending).
 Mind Body & Soul re-entered the top 10 at number 9 on 26 February 2005 (week ending).
 American Idiot re-entered the top 10 at number-one on 8 January 2005 (week ending) for 9 weeks, at number 9 on 2 April 2005 (week ending), and at number 7 on 30 July 2005 (week ending) for 2 weeks.
 Greatest Hits (Robbie Williams album) re-entered the top 10 at number 5 on 7 January 2006 (week ending) for 2 weeks.
 Speakerboxxx/The Love Below re-entered the top 10 at number 8 on 8 January 2005 (week ending).
 Kasabian re-entered the top 10 at number 4 on 22 January 2005 (week ending) for 3 weeks.
 Love. Angel. Music. Baby. re-entered the top 10 at number 7 on 26 March 2005 (week ending) for 4 weeks and at number 8 on 7 May 2005 (week ending) for 7 weeks.
 Tourist re-entered the top 10 at number 5 on 21 May 2005 (week ending) for 3 weeks.
 It's Time re-entered the top 10 at number 9 on 12 March 2005 (week ending).
 The Massacre re-entered the top 10 at number 8 on 21 May 2005 (week ending).
 Employment re-entered the top 10 at number 9 on 16 April 2005 (week ending) for 10 weeks, at number 7 on 9 July 2005 (week ending) for 12 weeks and at number 7 on 7 January 2006 (week ending) for 10 weeks.
 The Singles re-entered the top 10 at number 8 on 2 July 2005 (week ending) for 2 weeks.
 Finally Woken re-entered the top 10 at number 6 on 2 July 2005 (week ending) for 2 weeks.
 The Emancipation of Mimi re-entered the top 10 at number 9 on 2 July 2005 (week ending) for 5 weeks.
 Up All Night re-entered the top 10 at number 5 on 30 April 2005 (week ending) for 2 weeks and at number 9 on 16 July 2005 (week ending) for 2 weeks.
 Eye to the Telescope re-entered the top 10 at number 10 on 11 June 2005 (week ending) for 2 weeks, at number 7 on 10 September 2005 (week ending) for 8 weeks, at number 6 on 14 January 2006 (week ending) for 2 weeks and at number 4 on 25 February 2006 (week ending) for 5 weeks.
 Demon Days re-entered the top 10 at number 8 on 6 August 2005 (week ending) for 8 weeks, at number 10 on 3 December 2005 (week ending) for 2 weeks, at number 9 on 24 December 2005 (week ending) for 5 weeks and at number 7 on 25 February 2006 (week ending) for 3 weeks.
 Back to Bedlam re-entered the top 10 at number 10 on 10 December 2005 (week ending) for 15 weeks.
 Don't Believe the Truth re-entered the top 10 at number 9 on 13 August 2005 (week ending) for 2 weeks.
 Monkey Business re-entered the top 10 at number 10 on 22 April 2006 (week ending).
 X & Y re-entered the top 10 at number 8 on 25 February 2006 (week ending).
 The Magic Numbers re-entered the top 10 at number 8 on 20 August 2005 (week ending) for 2 weeks.
 The War of the Worlds originally peaked outside the top ten at number 24 upon its initial release in 1996. The album reached a new peak of number 23 the following year. It re-entered the top 10 at number 6 on 9 July 2005 (week ending) for 8 weeks.
 Stars of CCTV re-entered the top 10 at number 4 on 7 January 2006 (week ending) for 6 weeks.
 Breakaway re-entered the top 10 at number 8 on 10 September 2005 (week ending) for 7 weeks, at number 7 on 5 November 2005 (week ending) for 2 weeks, at number 9 on 26 November 2005 (week ending) for 8 weeks, at number 10 on 28 January 2006 (week ending) and at number 10 on 11 February 2006 (week ending) for 4 weeks.
 In Between Dreams re-entered the top 10 at number 9 on 28 January 2006 (week ending), at number 6 on 25 February 2006 (week ending) for 10 weeks and at number 10 on 13 May 2006 (week ending) for 4 weeks.
 PCD re-entered the top 10 at number 10 on 17 December 2005 (week ending) for 2 weeks, at number 9 on 7 January 2006 (week ending) and at number 7 on 8 July 2006 (week ending) for 2 weeks.
 Piece by Piece re-entered the top 10 at number 10 on 19 November 2005 (week ending), at number 10 on 24 December 2005 (week ending) for 2 weeks and at number 9 on 14 January 2006 (week ending) for 2 weeks.
 Taller in More Ways re-entered the top 10 at number 8 on 17 December 2005 (week ending).
 Greatest Hits (Mariah Carey album) originally peaked outside the top ten at number 46 upon its initial release in 2001.
 Keep On re-entered the top 10 at number 10 on 21 January 2006 (week ending) for 6 weeks and at number 10 on 6 May 2006 (week ending) for 3 weeks.
 Figure includes album that peaked in 2004.

See also
2005 in British music
List of number-one albums from the 2000s (UK)

References
General

Specific

External links
2005 album chart archive at the Official Charts Company (click on relevant week)

United Kingdom top 10 albums
Top 10 albums
2005